Martin Kevan (March 19, 1947 – May 1, 2013) was a Canadian actor, voice actor, and author.

Early life
Kevan was born in Nairobi, Kenya on March 19, 1947. He moved to Canada with his whole family in May, 1958. He attended McGill University, where he studied business and was active with the thespian community there. He decided to become an actor and acted on stage, film, radio and TV.

Death
He died after a brief battle with cancer in Montreal on 1 May 2013.

Acting Career
His roles include the drama Happiness Is Loving Your Teacher (1977), for which he was nominated as 'best actor' in the Canadian Film Awards.

Kevan also worked on the film "Arena" (1979), an 8-minute film by Lois Siegel.

Kevan also provided voice acting and motion capture for the video game Far Cry 3 as Dr. Alec Earnhart.

References

External links
IMDB Profile

1947 births
2013 deaths
Canadian male television actors
Canadian male voice actors
Canadian male novelists
Male actors from Montreal
Writers from Montreal
McGill University Faculty of Management alumni
People from Nairobi
Naturalized citizens of Canada
Deaths from cancer in Quebec
20th-century Canadian novelists
20th-century Canadian male writers